Narayani may refer to:

 Narayani (deity), another name for Lakshmi
 Narayani, an epithet of Yogamaya
 Narayani River, or Gandaki River, in Nepal
 Narayani Temple, in Narayani village, near Khalikote, Odisha, India
 Narayani Zone, a former administrative region of Nepal
 Narayani Shastri (fl. from 2000), Indian actress

See also

 Narayani Sena, army of Krishna in the Mahabharata